Neshaminy State Park is a  Pennsylvania state park in  Bensalem Township, Bucks County, Pennsylvania in the United States. Visitors to the park can catch a glimpse of the Philadelphia skyline from a hiking trail on Logan Point. The park is located at the confluence of Neshaminy Creek and the Delaware River. Neshaminy State Park is just off Interstate 95 on Pennsylvania Route 132.

History
Most of the lands of Neshaminy State Park were donated to the Commonwealth of Pennsylvania by the estate of Robert R. Logan in 1956. Logan was a descendant of James Logan who was the colonial secretary to William Penn the founder of Pennsylvania. Dunks Ferry Road, which forms the western boundary of the park, is one of the oldest roads in Pennsylvania. It was built in 1679 by Dunken Williams to provide access to his ferry which crossed the Delaware River. For forty years, the oral historian Alice of Dunk's Ferry collected tolls from those crossing the river. Dunks Ferry Inn was a major rest stop that served travelers from the mid-18th until the late 19th century.

Ecology

This combination of distance and elevation creates an estuary. The tidal effect causes the river to rise and fall each day. The Lenape who once lived on the banks of the river used tides to help them harvest fish. They built low fences in the tidal zone. At high tide the fish would swim in and be caught by the fences when the waters receded at low tide. According to the A. W. Kuchler U.S. potential natural vegetation types outside of the estuary, Neshaminy State Park would have a dominant vegetation type of Appalachian Oak (104) with a dominant vegetation form of Eastern hardwood forest (25).

Recreation

The Delaware River
Neshaminy State Park is the home of a 370 slip marina on the Delaware River. Demand for slips in the marina is always very high and the waiting list is long. This is due to the location of the park, it is located squarely within the heart of heavily populated southeastern Pennsylvania. Recreational boating on the Delaware River is especially popular in the summer months. Unlimited horsepower boats are permitted on the river. All boats must display a current registration with any state or have a launch permit from the Pennsylvania Fish and Boat Commission. The Delaware River is a warm water fishery. All fishermen are expected to follow the rules and regulations of the fish commission.

Swimming
Swimming is not permitted in the river. A swimming pool is open daily from 10:00am until 5:00pm weekdays and 10:00 am until 6:00 pm weekends, Memorial Day weekend through Labor Day weekend. Lifeguards are on duty. Ten dollars admission is charged to the pool area. For more info, contact http://www.neshaminypool.com.

Hiking
Logan Walk is the former driveway to the Logan home. This tree lined trail is paved and serves as a hiking trail and park service road. River Walk Trail is a loop that begins and ends at Logan Walk. It follows the bank of the Delaware River and passes by the estuary and tidal marsh.

Climate

Neshaminy State Park lies in the transition zone between the Temperate Continental climate to the north and the Humid subtropical climate to the south. According to the Trewartha climate classification system, Neshaminy State Park has a Temperate Oceanic climate (Do) with hot summers (a), cool winters (k) and year-around precipitation. Dcak climates are characterized by all months having an average mean temperature > , four to seven months with an average mean temperature ≥ , at least one month with an average mean temperature ≥  and no significant precipitation difference between seasons. Although most summer days are slightly humid at Neshaminy State Park, episodes of heat and high humidity can occur with heat index values > . The average wettest month is July which corresponds with the annual peak in thunderstorm activity. Since 1981, the wettest calendar day was 6.44 inches (164 mm) on 08/27/2011. Episodes of extreme cold and wind can occur with wind chill values < . The average annual snowfall (Nov-Apr) is between 24 and 30 inches (61 and 76 cm). The average snowiest month is February which corresponds with the peak in nor’easter activity.

Nearby state parks
The following state parks are within  of Neshaminy State Park:
Benjamin Rush State Park (Philadelphia County)
Bull's Island Recreation Area (New Jersey)
Delaware Canal State Park (Bucks and Northampton Counties)
Delaware and Raritan Canal State Park (New Jersey)
Evansburg State Park (Montgomery County)
Fort Washington State Park (Montgomery County) 
Nockamixon State Park (Bucks County)
Norristown Farm Park (Montgomery County)
Ralph Stover State Park (Bucks County)
Rancocas State Park (New Jersey)
Ridley Creek State Park (Delaware County)
Tyler State Park (Bucks County)
Washington Crossing State Park (New Jersey)

References

External links

  

State parks of Pennsylvania
Protected areas established in 1956
Parks in Bucks County, Pennsylvania